Badger Creek is a creek in Madison, Webster and Humboldt counties, Iowa, in the United States. It is a tributary of the Des Moines River.

Badger Creek was so named from a badger who fought a dog at the creek.

See also
List of rivers of Iowa

References

Rivers of Humboldt County, Iowa
Rivers of Webster County, Iowa
Rivers of Iowa